Nakhlemir (also Romanized as Nakhlemīr, Nakhl-e Mīr, Nakhl-i-Mir, and Nakhl Mīr) is a village in Bandar Charak Rural District, Shibkaveh District, Bandar Lengeh County, Hormozgan Province, Iran. At the 2006 census, its population was 177, in 37 families.

References 

Populated places in Bandar Lengeh County